Sylph was launched at Whitby in 1791. She made one voyage for the British East India Company (EIC) to New South Wales and China. However, a French privateer captured her in 1798 as she was returning to England.

Career
Sylph shifted her registration to London and entered Lloyd's Register (LR) in 1792 with A. Ward, master, J. Jackson, owner, and trade London–Saint Petersburg.

Lloyd's Register for 1796 showed Sylphs master changing from A. Ward to J. White. Her owner changed from J. Jackson to P. Faith, and her trade changed from London–Saint Petersburg to London–Botany Bay.

Captain John White acquired a letter of marque 14 June 1796. On 10 June he sailed for Botany Bay and China.

Sylph arrived at Port Jackson from England with merchandise on 12 November. She left for China on 6 December.

Fate
Lloyd's List reported on 20 March 1798 that Sylph was homeward bound from China when she parted from the convoy to the west of Cape Clear. It was believed that she had been captured. The EIC valued the cargo it had lost on Sylph at £32,542.

Notes, citations, and references
Notes

Citations

References
 

  
  

1791 ships
Ships built in Whitby
Age of Sail merchant ships of England
Ships of the British East India Company
Captured ships